Inkyu Lee from the Korea University, Seoul, Korea was named Fellow of the Institute of Electrical and Electronics Engineers (IEEE) in 2016 for contributions to multiple antenna systems for wireless communications.

References 

Fellow Members of the IEEE
Living people
Year of birth missing (living people)